Yesterday is a 1959 Hungarian drama film directed by Márton Keleti. It was entered into the 1st Moscow International Film Festival.

Cast
 Zoltán Makláry as Csendes Imre
 Ferenc Ladányi as Szabó alezredes
 Sándor Pécsi
 Antal Páger as Mácsay, volt foldbirtokos
 László Ungváry as Man in Mackintosh (as László Ungvári)
 János Görbe as Pandúr
 Tibor Bitskey
 Gyula Szabó as Szusza-Kis (as ifj. Szabó Gyula)
 Béla Barsi
 László Bánhidi (as Bánhidy László)
 Hilda Gobbi
 László Kozák

References

External links
 

1959 films
1959 drama films
1950s Hungarian-language films
Hungarian black-and-white films
Films directed by Márton Keleti
Hungarian drama films